The PRR J1 was a class of 2-10-4 "Texas" type steam locomotives with  driving wheels built between 1942 and 1944.

Features 
As with many of the Pennsylvania Railroad's steam locomotives, the J1 had its headlight above the smokebox. Like the M1 the J1 had a keystone numberplate, unlike the round numberplates seen on the rest of the PRR's freight steam locomotives. Wartime restrictions forbid the design of a completely new engine so the PRR basically adopted the C&O design almost without change. As a result, they were equipped with Baker valve gear instead of Walschaerts valve gear which was more common on the PRR. Additionally, they had radial-stay fireboxes instead of the Belpaire fireboxes seen on nearly all of the Pennsylvania Railroad's steam locomotives. Mechanically, these locomotives were identical to the C&O's T-1 class 2-10-4s. As initially built, the middle driver was blind to facilitate tracking on curves. With experience the railroad determined that this wasn't necessary and after shopping the middle driver was equipped with flanges. The engine did have lateral motion devices to allow some sideways drive axle travel which did enable it to work on Pennsy curves. Other PRR changes included the curved front side cab windows, and the cast pilot with drop coupler.

History 
During World War II, the PRR needed heavier locomotives to pull freight and military equipment, but wartime restrictions prohibited the development of a new locomotive design. In response to this the Pennsylvania Railroad borrowed a 2-6-6-4 Class A of the Norfolk & Western Railway and a 2-10-4 from the Chesapeake and Ohio Railroad. Both locomotives underwent extensive testing, with the C&O 2-10-4 chosen to be produced. A total of 125 were built at PRR's shops in Juniata, Pennsylvania. They came to be known as the PRR's "War Babies," but the J1's remained in service into the 1950s. When the Pennsylvania Railroad converted from steam power to diesel, 100 were scrapped in 1958 and the remaining 25 were scrapped the next year.

External links 
J1 class diagram

J1
2-10-4 locomotives
Railway locomotives introduced in 1942
Steam locomotives of the United States
Scrapped locomotives
Freight locomotives
Standard gauge locomotives of the United States